A. Mohan widely known as Editor Mohan (born Mohammed Jinnah Abdul Khader) is an Indian film editor, turned screenwriter, producer and distributor known for his works in Telugu, Tamil, Kannada, and Hindi language films. He owns the production houses M. M. Movie Arts, and M. L. Movie Arts.

Personal life
Mohammed Jinnah Abdul Khader alias Editor Mohan was born in a Tamil Rowther family from Tirumangalam, Madurai, Tamil Nadu and his wife Varalakshmi Mohan. He has two sons; his elder son Mohan Raja is a film director, with most of his films featuring younger son Jayam Ravi in the lead role, while his daughter Roja is a dentist.

Career
Mohan started his career as an editor and worked in approximately 200 films, he produced 10 Telugu films, 5 Tamil films, and dubbed 60 films from Telugu into Tamil.

Selected filmography
As assistant editor
Ellarum Innattu Mannar (1960)
Arasilankumari (1961)
Guruvunu Minchina Sishyudu (1963)
Navagraha Puja Mahima (1964)
Aggi Pidugu (1964)
Chikkadu Dorakadu (1967)
Kadaladu Vadaladu (1969)

As editor
Plus One +1 (2016)

As producer
Mamagaru (1991)
Bava Bavamaridi (1993)
Subhamasthu (1995)
Hitler (1997)
Manasichi Choodu (1998)
Hanuman Junction (2001)
Jayam (2003)
Thillalangadi  (2010)

As screenwriter and editing supervision
Bava Bavamaridi (1993)
Kshemamga Velli Labhamga Randi (2000)

Short film producer
Prezentacja (Short)

References

External links
 

Film editors from Tamil Nadu
Hindi film editors
Living people
Tamil film editors
Tamil film producers
Tamil people
Indian Muslims
Indian Hindus
Telugu film editors
Telugu film producers
University of Madras alumni
Year of birth missing (living people)